Edward Stephens (19 October 1811 – 4 December 1861) was one of the earliest settlers in the Colony of South Australia. He became a businessman in Adelaide, and was one of the founders of Methodism in South Australia.

Life
Stephens was born in London, the tenth child of Rev. John Stephens (1772–1841) who had been president of the Wesleyan Methodist Conference. His siblings included John (1806–1850) and Samuel (1808–1840).

He was a clerk and assistant cashier in the Hull Banking Company from 1833 until 1836, when he was appointed cashier and accountant of the South Australian Company. He sailed for South Australia on HMS Coromandel and on 17 January 1837 arrived at Holdfast Bay where he set up business in a tent. He bought eight acres in the new city of Adelaide.

In 1840 when the company's business was divided, Stephens became the Adelaide manager of the South Australian Banking Company, whose local board consisted of George Morphett, R. F. Newland and E. I. S. Trimmer. He was also a nominated member of the Legislative Council and was appointed a justice of the peace.

He was one of the founders of Methodism in Adelaide.

He was chairman of the Agricultural and Horticultural Society from 1847 to 1848.

He returned to London in 1855, where he continued to work in the interests of South Australia.

He died at Howard Lodge, Maida Vale, and was buried at West Norwood Cemetery.

References

English emigrants to colonial Australia
19th-century Australian judges
Settlers of South Australia
1811 births
1861 deaths
Burials at West Norwood Cemetery
Members of the South Australian Legislative Council
19th-century Australian politicians
Colony of South Australia judges